John Hirst is the name of:

John Hirst (businessman), Chief Executive of the UK Met Office
John Hirst (criminal) (born 1950), convicted of manslaughter in 1980 and a campaigner for prisoners' rights
 John Hirst (historian) (1942–2016), emeritus professor of history at La Trobe University, Melbourne, Australia
John Hirst (rugby league) (born 1970), rugby league footballer who played in the 1980s and 1990s for Wakefield Trinity
Jack Hirst, rugby league footballer who played in the 1920s for England, and Featherstone Rovers
John Malcolm Hirst (1921–1997), British aerobiologist, agricultural botanist, and mycologist

See also
John Hurst (disambiguation)
 Hirst (surname)